State Route 27, commonly known by its street name Topanga Canyon Boulevard, is a state highway in the U.S. state of California that runs from the Pacific Coast Highway (California State Route 1) at Topanga State Beach near Pacific Palisades, through the Topanga Canyon in Topanga, and continuing through Woodland Hills, Canoga Park, West Hills, and Chatsworth to the Ronald Reagan Freeway (State Route 118).

As one of the only routes across the Santa Monica Mountains, SR 27 is heavily traveled by commuters from the western San Fernando Valley heading to Santa Monica or Interstate 10.

Route description

SR 27 begins at SR 1 near the Pacific Ocean at Topanga County Beach, in an unincorporated area of Los Angeles County east of Malibu. It travels north as Topanga Canyon Boulevard, cutting through Topanga State Park. Upon exiting the park, SR 27 provides access to Fernwood, Topanga, Sylvia Park, and Glenview, all unincorporated. SR 27 continues winding into the San Fernando Valley, nearly entering Calabasas before entering the Los Angeles community of Woodland Hills. The route becomes a major city arterial through the valley, intersecting US 101 before entering Warner Center and Canoga Park. After traversing Chatsworth, SR 27 ends just past an interchange with the SR 118 freeway, thus providing access to the unincorporated area north of Chatsworth.

Metro Local line 150 runs on Topanga Canyon Boulevard.

Except for a small portion in the mountains, SR 27 is part of the National Highway System, a network of highways that are considered essential to the country's economy, defense, and mobility by the Federal Highway Administration. SR 27 is eligible for the State Scenic Highway System. A portion of it through Topanga Canyon has been officially designated as a scenic highway by the California Department of Transportation.

History
The original state highway system in 1933 included a highway from near Topanga Beach to Montalvo-San Fernando Road near Chatsworth. Two years later, this was numbered as Route 156. The route was redesignated as SR 27 in the 1964 state highway renumbering.

Major intersections

See also

References

External links

Caltrans: Route 27 highway conditions
California Highways: SR 27
California @ AARoads.com - State Route 27

State highways in California
State Scenic Highway System (California)
Roads in Los Angeles County, California
Streets in the San Fernando Valley
Santa Monica Mountains
Streets in Los Angeles